Yonglian (Chinese: 永璉; 9 August 1730 – 23 November 1738), formally known by his title as Crown Prince Duanhui (端慧皇太子), was an imperial prince of the Manchu-ruled Qing Dynasty. Yonglian was the second son of Emperor Qianlong by his wife, Empress Xiaoxianchun.

Life 
The prince was named by his grandfather, Emperor Yongzheng. The character lian (璉) in his name means vessel for holding grain offerings in an ancestral hall, which suggests that he would eventually inherit the imperial throne.

Yonglian was intelligent, noble and was the only direct son of Qianlong at that time. His father secretly appointed him as his heir. On 8 August 1736, Qianlong issued a secret decree to establish Yonglian as the crown prince. The decree was hidden behind a plaque in the Qianqing Palace.

He suffered from smallpox and died on 23 November 1738, while he was staying in Ningshou Palace (宁寿宫). Emperor Qianlong and Empress Fuca were devastated. Qianlong didn't go to court for five days, and he made public the secret appointment of Yonglian as crown prince. Emperor Qianlong ordered Yonglian's funeral to be treated as that of a crown prince. Yonglian was given the posthumous name Duanhui (端慧) and his father built a garden for his dead son to be buried. The garden is known as Crown Prince Duanhui's Garden.

In popular culture 

 Portrayed by Yu Yao in Ruyi's Royal Love in the Palace (2018)

Ancestry

References 

1730 births
1738 deaths
Heirs apparent who never acceded
Sons of emperors
Qianlong Emperor's sons